Arenimonas composti is a Gram-negative, non-spore-forming and motile bacterium from the genus of Arenimonas which has been isolated from compost from Daejeon in Korea.

References

Xanthomonadales
Bacteria described in 2007